South Hiendley is a civil parish in the metropolitan borough of the City of Wakefield, West Yorkshire, England.  The parish contains 14 listed buildings that are recorded in the National Heritage List for England.  Of these, one is  listed at Grade I, the highest of the three grades, and the others are at Grade II, the lowest grade.  The parish contains the village of South Hiendley and the small settlement of Felkirk, and the surrounding countryside.  The listed buildings consist of a church with monuments, a cross shaft, and a schoolroom in the churchyard, two houses, and a set of almshouses in two ranges and with a master's lodge.


Key

Buildings

References

Citations

Sources

 

Lists of listed buildings in West Yorkshire